Peter Rieger (born 5 January 1944) is a German boxer. He competed in the men's lightweight event at the 1968 Summer Olympics.

References

1944 births
Living people
German male boxers
Olympic boxers of East Germany
Boxers at the 1968 Summer Olympics
People from Nysa, Poland
Sportspeople from Opole Voivodeship
Lightweight boxers